Mecyclothorax brevipennis is a species of ground beetle in the subfamily Psydrinae. It was described by Perrault in 1984.

References

brevipennis
Beetles described in 1984